L series may refer to:
L-series trains in China
Saturn L series – sedans and station wagons
L-function
Honda L engine
Nissan L engine
Dirichlet L-function - mathematical functions in number theory
Rover L-series engine
Ford L series – trucks
Canon L lens
International Harvester L series – trucks
Lincoln L series – 1920 luxury cars
Cummins L-series engine
ThinkPad L series – laptop computers
Mercedes-Benz L-series truck
Rolls-Royce–Bentley L-series V8 engine
Sony Vaio L series – desktop computers
Subaru Leone
System Sensor L-Series fire alarm notification appliances 
Artin L-function
QI (L series), the twelfth series of quiz show QI

See also
 K series (disambiguation)
 M series (disambiguation)
 1 series (disambiguation)